Brittany Dawn Nelson (formerly Davis and Greisen, and commonly known as Brittany Dawn; born  ) is an American former businesswoman and social media personality. She gained attention in 2019 as an online fitness instructor and self-claimed nutritional expert who offered services through her company, Brittany Dawn Fitness LLC. She promoted diet plans, individualized fitness instruction and other products that were allegedly not received by customers. The controversy led to an ongoing lawsuit filed by the Texas Attorney General against Dawn for  misleading Texas consumers about her services.

Personal life 
Dawn is from Texas and was previously married. She claims to have worked as a veterinarian technician for five years. In September 2021, Dawn married her second husband, former police officer Jordan Nelson. Nelson formerly worked for the Kansas City, Missouri police department and was sued by the American Civil Liberties Union for excessive use of force on an unarmed black man. Dawn is a practicing Christian and has been accused of changing her online brand from primarily fitness content to Christian-based content in order to escape controversy.

Fitness and social media career 
Dawn started her fitness career in 2014 and formed the company Brittany Dawn Fitness LLC. Her business claimed to have provided tailored personal fitness plans, nutritional advice and text message communication from Dawn. Complaints of Brittany Dawn Fitness not providing services that were paid for began to emerge in 2015; customers alleged that their personalized plans were generic and that Dawn never contacted them to initiate their plans. Later, complaints made about her business were deleted from her social media profiles. She later appeared on ABC's Good Morning America in February 2019 to address the controversy and later posted an apology video on YouTube. Dawn later began offering refunds to customers in exchange for signing a non-disclosure agreement (NDA). It was announced in February 2022 that the Texas Attorney General Ken Paxton filed a lawsuit against Dawn and Brittany Dawn Fitness LLC for violating Texas state consumer protection laws and seeking up to US$1 million in damages. As part of her fitness business, which was defunct as of 2019, Dawn received $20,000 through the Paycheck Protection Program during the COVID-19 pandemic. She operated Brittany Dawn Fitness, LLC under the her previous name, Brittany Dawn Greisen.

In 2022 Dawn started a Christian ministry, She Lives Freed, and hosts conferences and retreats. It has been described as Pentecostal and a mix of Christianity and New Age.

Notes

References

External links 
Archived Brittany Dawn Fitness LLC website
Official website

Living people
1990s births
Christians from Texas
21st-century American businesswomen
21st-century American businesspeople
People from Texas
American TikTokers